() is a Hebrew curse placed after the name of particular enemies of the Jewish people. Yimakh shemo is one of the strongest curses in the Hebrew language.

Usage
The term, although Hebrew, may be inserted as a set phrase in languages other than Hebrew, including Yiddish, for example, "Dos iz a kol-boynik, yemakh-shmoy!" ("He is a scoundrel, yemakh-shmoy!") and English. When the phrase is used in English of plurals the Hebrew plural -am ("their names and their memories" yimach shemam ve-zichram) is applied. The epithet may be abbreviated as "Y. S." in some English texts. In Hebrew the abbreviation is   The curse connects with examples of erasure of names in other cultures. It has been called "the classic Jewish curse."

Haman and others
The phrase originates with Purim and Haman, but can be applied to any abhorrent enemy of the people such as Sabbatai Zevi, Bohdan Khmelnytsky, Spain, Joseph Stalin Russians, Poles, Adolf Hitler, Adolf Eichmann, Josef Mengele, any other Nazi, or even in cases of personal slight, such as of a bullying father, or conversely as the father of Israel Zangwill of his playwright son. Chofetz Chaim used the epithet of the man who tried to persuade him to abandon his studies.

There are only a very small number of texts where yimakh shemo is used of Jesus, although the tradition that Yeshu ( – ( minus the ayin) is related to the yimach shemo has a little popular circulation, maybe an inheritance from medieval polemical traditions. An early introduction of this connection into Lutheran literature was made by convert Johan Kemper.

Amalek
Although the immediate context of the phrase yimakh shemo vezikhro is related to Haman, some sources suggest that the second part of the phrase, "and his memory", harks back to the instruction to "obliterate the memory of Amalek" in Deuteronomy 25:19, and Exodus 17:14. This connection is supported in some sources by the idea that Haman is a descendant of Amalek.

Usage in English and Yiddish literature
Saul Bellow places the phrase in the mouth of the titular character of his novel Herzog to comically depict his anger. Leo Haber's The Red Heifer (2001), set in New York's Lower East Side in the 1940s, includes the term in a glossary.

Related terms
In Yiddish a derived noun, formed with the Slavonic -nik nominalizing suffix, is  'scoundrel' (feminine ) but this is not used with the strength of the original epithet .

The term yimakh shemo is often used in combination with the term meshummad from the root shamad, which signifies to destroy.

The obliteration of Amalek's memory has been compared to the Latin  by several European academics.

References

Hebrew words and phrases
Curses
Damnatio memoriae